Walter Channing may refer to:
 Walter Channing (physician) (1786–1876), American physician
 Walter Channing Jr., 20th-century American businessman